Richard Smith (born July 16, 1980, in Shreveport, Louisiana) is a former professional American football wide receiver.

Smith played four games in National Football League with the Kansas City Chiefs along with spending time on the practice rosters for the Washington Redskins and the Seattle Seahawks.

Smith played college football at the University of Arkansas and was a long jumper for the Razorback track team.

References

1980 births
Living people
Players of American football from Shreveport, Louisiana
American football wide receivers
Arkansas Razorbacks football players
Kansas City Chiefs players
Canadian football wide receivers
Edmonton Elks players
Arkansas Razorbacks men's track and field athletes